The Kaduna River is a tributary of the Niger River which flows for  through Nigeria. It got its name from the crocodiles that lived in the river and surrounding area. Kaduna in the native dialect, Hausa, was the word for "crocodiles". Most of its course passes through open savanna woodland, but its lower section has cut several gorges above its entrance into the extensive Niger floodplains.

See also
Zungeru

References

Rivers of Nigeria